Mount Macklin is a mountain having 2 peaks, the higher at , between Mount Carse and Douglas Crag in the southern part of the Salvesen Range of South Georgia. It was surveyed by the South Georgia Survey in the period 1951–57, and was named by the UK Antarctic Place-Names Committee for Alexander H. Macklin, the medical officer of the Imperial Trans-Antarctic Expedition under Ernest Shackleton, 1914–16. Macklin accompanied Shackleton in the voyage of the James Caird from Elephant Island to King Haakon Bay, South Georgia.

References

Mountains and hills of South Georgia